Lowder is an unincorporated community in Sangamon County, Illinois, United States. Lowder had a post office, which closed on October 24, 2010.

References

Unincorporated communities in Sangamon County, Illinois
Unincorporated communities in Illinois